Horst "Leo" Leupold (born 30 January 1942) is a retired German football player. He spent six seasons in the Bundesliga with 1. FC Nürnberg.

Honours
1. FC Nürnberg
 Bundesliga: 1967–68

External links
 
 Horst Leupold at glubberer.de 

1942 births
Living people
German footballers
Bundesliga players
1. FC Nürnberg players
Association football defenders
Footballers from Nuremberg